Diana Magnuson is an artist whose work has appeared in role-playing games.

Career
Diana Magnuson earned a BA in art and German, with a minor in Education, from Gustavus Adolphus College, Minnesota. Her Dungeons & Dragons work includes the Dragonlance adventures Dragons of Ice, Dragons of Light, Dragons of War, Dragons of Deceit, Dragons of Dreams, Dragons of Glory, Dragons of Faith, Dragons of Truth, and Dragons of Triumph.

Magnuson is also known for illustrating children's books.

References

External links
 Diana Magnuson's website
 

American children's book illustrators
American women illustrators
Gustavus Adolphus College alumni
Living people
Place of birth missing (living people)
Role-playing game artists
Year of birth missing (living people)